The naval Battle of the Counts took place on 23 June 1287 at Naples, Italy, when an Aragonese-Sicilian galley fleet commanded by Roger of Lauria defeated a large combined Angevin (Kingdom of Naples) galley fleet commanded respectively by Reynald III Quarrel of Avella and Narjot de Toucy.

Lauria had taken his fleet to Augusta, eastern Sicily, after a report of an Angevin galley fleet landing invasion troops there. He landed his troops, who recaptured the town, leaving the Angevins holed up in the castle. However, the invasion was a decoy and the Angevin galleys had sailed around the south of Sicily and linked up with their allies, forming a fleet about twice the size of Lauria's. Their plan was to land troops in the south-west of Sicily.

Lauria searched for the allied fleet and finally found it at Naples. Unable to attack it close to the city, he bombarded the nearby coast to lure it out, as he had done in 1284, and sent in a formal challenge. The Angevin fleet came out arranged in five squadrons, each commanded by a count (hence the name of the battle). They were Reynald III Quarrel of Avella, Hugh of Brienne, the Count of Aquila, Count Jean de Joinville and Guy de Montfort, Count of Nola. Each of their flag-galleys was surrounded to each side by four other galleys and to the rear by two galleys. The fleet flag-galley had two galleys to its front also. This made 63 galleys, and there may have been a small reserve since about 70 of the about 84 Angevin galleys are said to have come out to fight. Two tarides carried the Papal and Angevin banners.

Lauria had around 40-45 galleys. He followed his usual tactic and retreated until the Angevin galleys had become disorganized, weathered their initial attack, then counter attacked from the sides, damaging the Angevin galleys oars. In a battle lasting much of the day, Henry di Mari again fled, leaving about 40 Angevin galleys to be captured, along with 5,000 prisoners, including many counts and barons.

Counts
Counts
Counts
Counts
1287 in Europe
13th century in Aragon
13th century in the Kingdom of Naples
13th century in the Kingdom of Sicily
the Counts